Keith Peacock (born 2 May 1945) is an English former footballer and manager.  He was the first player to come on as a substitute in the Football League.

Early life
Peacock was born in Barnehurst. and educated at Erith Grammar School.

Playing career
Peacock played his entire professional career for Charlton Athletic, making over 500 Football League appearances between 1962 and 1979. In May 1963 he scored in the 2-1 last day of season victory at Walsall that kept Charlton in the second tier and relegated Walsall.  On 21 August 1965, he became the first substitute used in the Football League when he replaced injured goalkeeper Mick Rose after 11 minutes of an away match against Bolton Wanderers.

He played for the Columbus Magic of the ASL before joining his old friend Gordon Jago as his assistant manager and player at the Tampa Bay Rowdies in the North American Soccer League until 1982. Peacock's last appearance as a player for the Rowdies was during the 1980–81 indoor season.

Managerial career
Peacock was manager of Gillingham between 1981 and 1987 and then Maidstone United between 1989 and 1991. He later served as assistant manager at Charlton Athletic before stepping down after the resignation of Alan Curbishley in 2006. He moved to West Ham United where he became first a scout and then assistant manager under Alan Pardew and Alan Curbishley. He ended this role at the end of the 2006–07 season.

In September 2007 Peacock returned to Charlton in the role of honorary associate director.

On 4 January 2011, Peacock was appointed caretaker manager of Charlton following the departure of Phil Parkinson.

Personal life
Peacock married Lesley and has a son, Gavin (born 1967), who also became a professional footballer. He also has a daughter called Lauren and four grandchildren. In 2004, his autobiography No Substitute was published by Charlton Athletic. In 2013, he was inducted into the Charlton Athletic Hall of Fame.

References

Living people
1945 births
English footballers
Association football midfielders
English Football League players
North American Soccer League (1968–1984) indoor players
American Soccer League (1933–1983) players
Charlton Athletic F.C. players
Columbus Magic players
Tampa Bay Rowdies (1975–1993) players
English football managers
Gillingham F.C. managers
Maidstone United F.C. (1897) managers
Queens Park Rangers F.C. non-playing staff
West Ham United F.C. non-playing staff
Charlton Athletic F.C. non-playing staff
English expatriate footballers
English expatriate sportspeople in the United States
Expatriate soccer players in the United States